David Wilcox is a television writer and producer.

Career
He is known for working on series such as Law & Order, Dragnet, and the American remake of Life on Mars.

ABC picked up 666 Park Avenue to pilot. Wilcox created the project and served as executive producer and writer.

Fringe
In Summer 2009, Wilcox joined the FOX series Fringe as a co-executive producer and writer at the beginning of season two. He left the show after the third season finale. Episodes he contributed to are as follows:
"Fracture"
"Snakehead"
"Do Shapeshifters Dream of Electric Sheep?" (co-written with Matthew Pitts)
"The Abducted" (co-written by executive story editor Graham Roland)
"Immortality" (co-written by story editor Ethan Gross)
"6:02 AM EST" (co-written with co-executive producer Josh Singer and Roland)

References

External links 
 

American television writers
American male television writers
Living people
Year of birth missing (living people)